Mission Milano is a 2016 Chinese-Hong Kong action adventure comedy film directed by Wong Jing, produced by and starring Andy Lau. The film co-stars Huang Xiaoming, Shen Teng, Wong Cho-lam, Michelle Hu and Nana Ouyang. It was released in China on September 30, 2016.

Synopsis
Rogue terrorists steal the revolutionary invention, the Seed of God, for world domination. After Interpol agent Sir Sampan's underhanded tactics to recruit young billionaire Luo, the team rallies to rescue and retrieve their prized invention.

Cast

Reception
The film has grossed  at the Chinese box office.

References

External links

Chinese action comedy films
Hong Kong action comedy films
Chinese action adventure films
2016 action comedy films
Wuzhou Film Distribution films
Films produced by Andy Lau
Films directed by Wong Jing
China Film Group Corporation films
Flagship Entertainment films
2010s Hong Kong films